The second-generation Magic Trackpad (initially marketed as Magic Trackpad 2) is a multi-touch and Force Touch trackpad produced by Apple Inc. It was announced on October 13, 2015 alongside the Magic Keyboard and second-generation Magic Mouse, and replaces the first-generation Magic Trackpad.

Description 
The second-generation Magic Trackpad is similar to its predecessor, with the key differences being a larger form factor, rechargeable  lithium-ion battery and Force Touch. The trackpad also provides haptic feedback via Apple's built-in Taptic Engine that is also used in MacBook trackpads. The Lightning connector is used for charging and pairing.

The second-generation Magic Trackpad has been released in a variety of colors. A space gray color was introduced with the iMac Pro in 2017, alongside a color-matching Magic Keyboard; both were later made available as standalone purchases. iPadOS 13.4 introduced mouse support to iPads for the first time, and supports all functionality of the second-generation Magic Trackpad.

Six pastel models (red, orange, yellow, green, blue, and purple) were introduced in 2021 to match the colors of the M1 iMac. Additionally, standalone purchases now include a USB-C to Lightning cable, instead of USB-A. In 2022 the space gray color was replaced by a black-and-silver version which was previously only available bundled with the third-generation Mac Pro.

See also 
 Magic Keyboard
 Magic Mouse

References 

Apple Inc. peripherals
Computer-related introductions in 2015
Computer mice